The Tolstoy Foundation is a non-profit charitable and philanthropic organization. It was established on April 26, 1939, by Alexandra Tolstaya, the youngest daughter of the Russian writer Leo Tolstoy, and her friend Tatiana Schaufuss. Its headquarters are in Valley Cottage, New York.

Activities
Its original purpose was to help Russian refugees from Europe and Soviet Union. Later, the foundation played an important role in helping Soviet displaced persons, dissidents and former Soviet citizens to settle in the West. Presently among its goals the foundation lists education and training programs worldwide. Tolstoy Foundation has many branches of humanitarian organizations: it has elderly care homes, homes for orphaned children, free cultural institutes and kindergarten and education institutes.

Church of Saint Sergius of Radonezh - Russian Orthodox Church Outside Russia - consecrated in 1940

Officials 
President
Alexandra Tolstaya 1939-1976
Tatiana Schaufuss 1976-1986
Teymuraz K. Bagration 1986-1992
Andrew Kotchoubey, PhD 1992-1996
The position of President was eliminated in 1996

Chairman
Plato Malozemoff
Constantine Sidamon-Eristoff
Eugenia Jahnke 
Boris Vanadzin, MD 1992-2009

References

Sources 
 Tolstoy Foundation homepage
 Orthodox organisations of America

External links 
 Saint Sergius Learning Center founded in association with Tolstoy Foundation in Valley Cottage

Non-profit organizations based in New York (state)
Charities based in New York (state)
Organizations established in 1939
Foundations based in the United States
Russian communities in the United States
Churches of Russian America
Russian Orthodox church buildings in the United States